Kang Myung Sun (born 1974 in Seoul, South Korea) is a South Korean artist. Kang is well known for her mother-of-pearl design art. Kang graduated Hongik University in South Korea with a PhD in Space Design and a BFA in woodworking and furniture design.

She challenges modern designs with her own study on physical properties of new materials and approach. Kang applies traditional lacquering techniques of two thousand-year history in an attempt to feature the delicate and iridescent quality of mother-of-pearl.

Work

Selected solo exhibitions
 2006 Art Furniture, Gallery I, Seoul

Selected group exhibitions
 2015 Living In Art II, Connect, Seomi International, Los Angeles, CA, USA
 2015 Living In Art I, Let's Art, Seomi International, Los Angeles, CA, USA
 2013 Contemporary Korean Design 2, R20th Century Gallery, New York
 2012 Small Object Show, R20th Century Gallery, New York
 2009 Korea Tomorrow 2009, SETEC, Seoul
 2008 12 Furniture Designers, Sangsangmadang Art Square, Seoul
 2007 Professional Designers of Cheongju International Craft Biennale, Cheongju

References

External links
 Official Website
 
 
 
 https://web.archive.org/web/20150518094344/http://www.egalleryi.co.kr/board/board.php?board=expast&page=58&command=body&no=15
 
 
 

South Korean artists
1974 births
Living people
South Korean women artists